Jeong Sung-kyung (born February 6, 1990), also known by her stage name Hari, is a South Korean singer. She rose to prominence after her single, "Gwiyomi", became internet phenomenon in early 2013. She is signed under Dandi Recordz.

Filmography

Television

Discography

Singles

References

External links
 Hari on Dandi Recordz
 
 

South Korean women pop singers
1990 births
Living people
21st-century South Korean singers
21st-century South Korean women singers